Roscommon was a parliamentary constituency represented in Dáil Éireann, the lower house of the Irish parliament or Oireachtas from 1923 to 1969 and from 1981 to 1992. The method of election was proportional representation by means of the single transferable vote (PR-STV).

History and boundaries 
The constituency has had two separate periods of existence:
from the 1923 general election until its abolition at the 1969 general election, when it was amalgamated into the Roscommon–Leitrim constituency, which in turn existed until the 1981 general election. At different periods it returned 4, 3 or 4 TDs. It comprised the administrative county of Roscommon.
as a 3-seat constituency from the 1981 general election until its abolition at the 1992 general election to be replaced by the 4-seat constituency of Longford–Roscommon. It comprised the administrative county of Roscommon; and, in the administrative county of Galway, the district electoral divisions of: Ballinastack, Ballymoe, Ballynakill, Boyounagh, Creggs, Island, Kilcroan, Templetogher, Toberroe, in the former Rural District of Glennamaddy.

For the 2007 general election, the county was represented by the new Roscommon–South Leitrim constituency.

TDs

TDs 1923–1969

TDs 1981–1992

Elections

1989 general election

1987 general election

November 1982 general election

February 1982 general election

1981 general election

1965 general election

1964 by-election 
Following the death of Fine Gael TD James Burke, a by-election was held on 8 July 1964. The seat was won by the Fine Gael candidate Joan Burke, widow of the deceased TD.

1961 general election

1957 general election

1954 general election

1951 general election

1948 general election

1944 general election

1943 general election

1938 general election

1937 general election

1933 general election

1932 general election 
Details of the fifth count are not available. Gallagher notes  it is unclear as to why the returning officer proceeded with the elimination of O'Dowd on the final count.

September 1927 general election

June 1927 general election

1925 by-election 
Following the resignation of Cumann na nGaedheal TD Henry Finlay, a by-election was held on 11 March 1925. The seat was won by the Cumann na nGaedheal candidate Martin Conlon.

1923 general election

See also 
Dáil constituencies
Politics of the Republic of Ireland
Historic Dáil constituencies
Elections in the Republic of Ireland

References

External links 
Oireachtas Members Database

Historic constituencies in County Roscommon
Dáil constituencies in the Republic of Ireland (historic)
1923 establishments in Ireland
1969 disestablishments in Ireland
Constituencies established in 1923
Constituencies disestablished in 1969
1981 establishments in Ireland
1992 disestablishments in Ireland
Constituencies established in 1981
Constituencies disestablished in 1992